South Chingford is an area of Chingford in east London, England. It is a largely residential area which is the location of the Chingford Hall Estate, Chingford Mount and the former Walthamstow Stadium.

The boundaries of South Chingford are commonly taken to be New Road to the north, the Lea Valley to the west and the North Circular Road to the south. To the east, South Chingford borders Highams Park, and the town of Walthamstow to the south. It comprises the Waltham Forest London Borough Council wards of Larkswood and Valley.

History 
Much of South Chingford was historically part of the borough of Walthamstow, including the Walthamstow Stadium (and hence the origin of that name). It was previously the home of a number of factories including a large Durex condom factory which closed in 1994.

Features 
South Chingford has many green open spaces including Ainslie Wood, Larks Wood and Memorial Park. The River Ching flows through the area and marked the historic boundary between Walthamstow and Chingford. Recently Fergal Sharkey hiked along the River Ching to raise awareness of pollution in the river.

South Chingford has no underground or railway station, but is close to Highams Park railway station. Chingford Road and Chingford Mount Road are a major bus corridor with bus routes 97, 215 and 357.

References

Districts of the London Borough of Waltham Forest
Areas of London